Strumigenys lyroessa is a species of ant found in Bhutan, India, and Sri Lanka.

External links

 at antwiki.org
Itis.org
Animaldiversity Web

Myrmicinae
Hymenoptera of Asia